Sleaford Mods are an English post-punk music duo, formed in 2007 in Nottingham. The band features vocalist Jason Williamson and, since 2012, musician Andrew Fearn. They are known for their abrasive, minimalist musical style and embittered explorations of austerity-era Britain, culture, and working class life, delivered in Williamson's East Midlands accent. The duo have released several albums to critical praise.

History

Williamson was born 10 November 1970, and raised in Grantham, Lincolnshire. Inspired by the mod subculture and musical sources like the Wu-Tang Clan, he spent several years pursuing music unsuccessfully, both with various groups and as a solo singer-songwriter. He had also worked as a session musician with local artists as well as Spiritualized and Bent. Fearn (born 1971 in Burton upon Trent) grew up on a farm in Saxilby, Lincolnshire.

Williamson first met Fearn in 2009 after hearing him DJ at a small Nottingham club called the Chameleon, where he was playing his own rough-edged and minimal grime-inspired tracks. Sleaford Mods began when Simon Parfrement, a friend of Williamson's, suggested he combine his vocals with a music sample from a Roni Size album. Originally, the project was called "That's Shit, Try Harder", but was later changed in reference to Sleaford, a town in Lincolnshire, not far from Grantham.

Williamson formed the band with Simon Parfrement, with whom he worked alongside a studio engineer at Rubber Biscuit Studio in Nottingham on their first four albums. Parfrement left the music production to Andrew Fearn after the release of the 2012 album Wank, the first album to feature Fearn, but Parfrement continues to play an important role with the band as their photographer and media producer.

On 10 December 2014, Williamson published the lyrics collection Grammar Wanker: Sleaford Mods 2007-2014, followed by Jason Williamson's House Party: Sleaford Mods 2014-2019 in 2019.

A collaboration between Sleaford Mods and The Prodigy was announced at the end of 2014. They recorded a track together, "Ibiza", which appears on The Prodigy album The Day Is My Enemy, released in March 2015.

The Leftfield album Alternative Light Source, released on 8 June 2015, also features a collaboration with Sleaford Mods, a track called "Head and Shoulders". The video for "Head and Shoulders" is a stop-motion/animation hybrid that debuted in August 2015. In July 2015, the band released a new album, Key Markets. It was one of the 19 records nominated for the IMPALA Album of the Year Award.

The band featured in two documentary films, Sleaford Mods: Invisible Britain, released in 2015 and Bunch of Kunst. A Film About Sleaford Mods, released in 2017.

In 2016, an important turning point took place after many years, as Sleaford Mods left Harbinger Sound and signed with Rough Trade Records. Their first release on the new label was the T.C.R. EP in 2016.

In 2017, following the release of English Tapas, Sleaford Mods embarked on their first North American tour.

One year later, Sleaford Mods left Rough Trade, which eventually led to the dismissal of their long-time manager (and owner of Harbinger Records), Steve Underwood.

After releasing Eton Alive on their own label Extreme Eating Records in 2019, the band returned to Rough Trade. This renewed cooperation resulted in the release of the compilation All That Glue in 2020 and Spare Ribs in 2021 (including the single "Mork n Mindy", which was released on 30 October 2020, and reached the top of the UK vinyl singles chart).

In 2019, Williamson lent his vocals to the track "Talk Whiff" by Scorn. In 2022, Williamson acted as Lazarus in the series finale of Peaky Blinders. Sleaford Mods appear alongside Orbital on the song "Dirty Rat", released on 20 October 2022.

Their twelfth album, UK Grim, was released on 10 March 2023.

Musical style
Sleaford Mods have described their work as "electronic munt minimalist punk-hop rants for the working class." Williamson is responsible for the words, Fearn for the music. Sleaford Mods songs have been described as embittered rants about such topics as unemployment, modern working life, celebrities and pop culture, capitalism and society in general. The lyrics usually contain profanity, which is, according to Williamson, the way in which he speaks and "not just fucking swearing". Fearn's music has been described as "purgatorial loop[s]" of "pugilistic post-punk-style bass; functional but unprepossessing beats; occasional cheap keyboard riffs and listless wafts of guitar."

Williamson's voice on Sleaford Mods songs is sprechgesang, rapped with an East Midlands dialect. His vocal and lyrical style has variously been compared to Shaun Ryder, John Cooper Clarke, Mark E. Smith, Ian Dury, The Streets and Half Man Half Biscuit as well as various punk and oi! artists. Williamson has cited influences including the mod subculture, the Wu-Tang Clan, Stone Roses, Nas, Red Snapper, Trim, Two Lone Swordsmen, rave and black metal.

Discography

Studio albums

Compilation albums

Live albums

Extended plays

Singles

References

External links
 
 

Musical groups from Nottingham
English electronic music duos
English hip hop groups
Political music groups
Rough Trade Records artists
Electropunk musical groups
Ipecac Recordings artists
Rock music duos
Hip hop duos